The United Nations Economic and Social Council (ECOSOC;) is one of the six principal organs of the United Nations, responsible for coordinating the economic and social fields of the organization, specifically in regards to the fifteen specialised agencies, the eight functional commissions, and the five regional commissions under its jurisdiction.

ECOSOC serves as the central forum for discussing international economic and social issues, and formulating policy recommendations addressed to member states and the United Nations System. It has 54 members. In addition to a rotating membership of 54 UN member states, over 1,600 nongovernmental organizations have consultative status with the Council to participate in the work of the United Nations.

ECOSOC holds one four-week session each year in July, and since 1998 has also held an annual meeting in April with finance ministers of heading key committees of the World Bank and the International Monetary Fund (IMF). Additionally, the High-Level Political Forum (HLPF), which reviews the implementation of the 2030 Agenda for Sustainable Development, is convened under the auspices of the Council every July.

President 

The president of the Council is elected for a one-year term and chosen from the small or medium sized states represented on the Council at the beginning of each new session. The presidency rotates among the United Nations Regional Groups to ensure equal representation.

Lachezara Stoeva, Permanent Representative of Bulgaria, was elected as the seventy-seventh president of the Council on 25 July 2022. Ambassador Lachezara Stoeva said in her opening statement that she was “honoured and humbled” to have been elected to lead one of the principal organs of the UN, while noting that the upcoming session will be “especially challenging for the world”. She succeeded Collen Vixen Kelapile, who was elected as the seventy-seventh president of the Council on 23 July 2021, succeeding Munir Akram of Pakistan.

Members 

The Council consists of 54 Member States, which are elected yearly by the General Assembly for overlapping three-year terms. Seats on the Council are allocated ensuring equitable geographic rotation among the United Nations regional groups, with 14 being allocated to the African Group, 11 to the Asia-Pacific Group, 6 to the Eastern European Group, 10 to the Latin American and Caribbean Group and 13 to the Western European and Others Group.

Current members

Observer Inter-Governmental Autonomous Organisations 
Participation on a continuing basis:

Participation on an ad hoc basis:

Commissions

Functional commissions

Active 
The following are the active functional commission of the Council:

 Commission on Narcotic Drugs (CND)
 Commission on Population and Development (CPD)
 Commission on Science and Technology for Development (CSTD)
 Commission on the Status of Women (CSW) 
 Statistical Commission 
 Commission for Social Development (CSocD)
 Commission on Crime Prevention and Criminal Justice (CCPCJ)
 Forum on Forests (UNFF)

Disbanded 
The following commissions were disbanded by the Council and replaced by other bodies:
 Commission on Human Rights (UNCHR) 
 Disbanded in 2006 and replaced by the United Nations Human Rights Council (UNHRC), a subsidiary organ of the General Assembly.
 Commission on Sustainable Development (CSD) 
 Disbanded in 2013 and replaced by the High-level Political Forum on Sustainable Development (HLPF), a joint subsidiary body of the General Assembly and ECOSOC.

Regional commissions 
The following are the active regional commissions of the Council:
 United Nations Economic Commission for Europe (ECE)
 United Nations Economic Commission for Africa (ECA)
 United Nations Economic Commission for Latin America and the Caribbean (ECLAC)
 United Nations Economic and Social Commission for Asia and the Pacific (ESCAP)
 United Nations Economic and Social Commission for Western Asia (ESCWA)

Committees and other bodies 
The following are some of the other bodies that the Council oversees in some capacity:

Standing committees 
 Committee for Programme and Coordination (CPC)
 Committee on Non-Governmental Organizations
Committee on Negotiations with Intergovernmental Agencies

Expert bodies 
 Committee for Development Policy (CDP)
 Committee on Economic, Social and Cultural Rights (CESCR)
 Committee of Experts on Global Geospatial Information Management (UN-GGIM)
 Committee of Experts on International Cooperation in Tax Matters
 Committee of Experts on Public Administration (CEPA)
 Committee of Experts on the Transport of Dangerous Goods and the Globally Harmonized System of Classification and Labelling of Chemicals
 Group of Experts on Geographical Names (UNGEGN)
 Intergovernmental Working Group of Experts on International Standards of Accounting and Reporting
 Permanent Forum on Indigenous Issues (UNPFII)

Other subsidiary bodies 
 System Chief Executives Board for Coordination (CEB)
 High-Level Committee on Management (HLCM)
 High-Level Committee on Programmes (HLCP)

Specialized agencies 

The specialized agencies of the United Nations are autonomous organizations working within the United Nations System, meaning that while they report their activities to the Economic and Social Council, they are mostly free to their own devices. Each agency must negotiate with the Council as to what their relationship will look and work like. This leads to a system where different organizations maintain different types of relationships with the Council. Some were created before the United Nations existed and were integrated into the system, others were created by the League of Nations and were integrated by its successor, while others were created by the United Nations itself to meet emerging needs.

The following is a list of the specialized agencies reporting to the Council:

 Food and Agriculture Organization (FAO)
 International Civil Aviation Organization (ICAO)
 International Fund for Agricultural Development (IFAD)
 International Labour Organization (ILO)
 International Monetary Fund (IMF)
 International Maritime Organization (IMO)
 International Telecommunication Union (ITU)
 United Nations Educational, Scientific and Cultural Organization (UNESCO)
 United Nations Industrial Development Organization (UNIDO)
 United Nations World Tourism Organization (UNWTO)
 Universal Postal Union (UPU)
 World Bank Group (WBG)
 International Bank for Reconstruction and Development (IBRD)
 International Development Association (IDA)
 International Finance Corporation (IFC)
 Multilateral Investment Guarantee Agency (MIGA)
 International Centre for Settlement of Investment Disputes (ICSID)
 World Health Organization (WHO)
 World Intellectual Property Organization (WIPO)
 World Meteorological Organization (WMO)

"World Economic and Social Survey 2011: The Great Green Technological Transformation" 

In a report issued in early July 2011, the UN called for spending nearly US$2  trillion on green technologies to prevent what it termed "a major planetary catastrophe", warning that "It is rapidly expanding energy use, mainly driven by fossil fuels, that explains why humanity is on the verge of breaching planetary sustainability boundaries through global warming, biodiversity loss, and disturbance of the nitrogen-cycle balance and other measures of the sustainability of the earth's ecosystem".

UN Secretary-General Ban Ki-moon added: "Rather than viewing growth and sustainability as competing goals on a collision course, we must see them as complementary and mutually supportive imperatives". The report concluded that "Business as usual is not an option".

Reform of the Economic and Social Council 
The governance of the multilateral system has historically been complex and fragmented. This has limited the capacity of ECOSOC to influence international policies in trade, finance, and investment. Reform proposals aim to enhance the relevance and contribution of the council. A major reform was approved by the 2005 World Summit based on proposals submitted by secretary-general Kofi Annan. The Summit aimed to establish ECOSOC as a quality platform for high-level engagement among member states and with international financial institutions, the private sector, and civil society on global trends, policies, and action. It resolved to hold biennial high-level Development Cooperation Forums at the national-leadership level, transforming the high-level segment of the Council to review trends in international development cooperation and promote greater coherence in development activities. At the Summit it was also decided to hold annual ministerial-level substantive reviews to assess progress in achieving internationally agreed on development goals (particularly the Millennium Development Goals). These "Annual Ministerial Reviews" will be replaced by the High-Level Political Forum from 2016 onwards after the new post-MDG/post-2015 Sustainable Development Goals are agreed upon.

Subsequent proposals by the High-Level Panel Report on System-Wide Coherence in November 2006 aimed to establish a forum within the ECOSOC as a counter-model to the exclusive clubs of the G8 and G20. The Forum was to comprise 27 heads of state (L27, corresponding to half of ECOSOC's membership) to meet annually and provide international leadership in the development area. This proposal, however, was not approved by the General Assembly.

Chamber design 
The Economic and Social Council Chamber in the United Nations Conference Building was a gift from Sweden. It was conceived by Swedish architect Sven Markelius, one of the 11 architects in the international team that designed the UN headquarters. Wood from Swedish pine trees was used in the delegates' area for the railings and doors.

The pipes and ducts in the ceiling above the public gallery were deliberately left exposed; the architect believed that anything useful could be left uncovered. The "unfinished" ceiling is a symbolic reminder that the economic and social work of the United Nations is never finished; there will always be something more that can be done to improve living conditions for the world's people.

See also 
 List of organizations with consultative status to the United Nations Economic and Social Council
 Copenhagen Consensus
 French Economic and Social Council
 European Economic and Social Committee (EU)
 Hard Choices: Moral Dilemmas in Humanitarian Intervention
 International Court of Justice
 International Hydrological Programme
 UN Secretariat
 UN Security Council
 UN Trusteeship Council
 UN Department of Economic and Social Affairs
 Union of International Associations
 Science, technology, engineering, and mathematics
 Chapter X of the United Nations Charter

References

Further reading 
 Mathews-Schultz, A. (2020). "The Untold History of the United Nations, the US State Department, and Organized Interests in the Postwar Era." Social Science History, 44(2), 197-222.

External links 

 United Nations Economic and Social Council
 UN Economic and Social Council – Background
 United Nations Department of Economic and Social Affairs
 Congo – Conference of UN NGO's
 Global Policy Forum – Social and Economic Policy at the UN
 United Nations
 The Group of Eight, ECOSOC and the Constitutional Paradox 

 
Economic development organizations
United Nations organs